Maricle is a surname. Notable people with the surname include:

Allen Maricle (born 1962), American politician and communication specialist
Jason Maricle, American soccer player
Leona Maricle (1905–1988), American actress
Sherrie Maricle (born 1963), American jazz drummer